The 1938 Brooklyn Dodgers season was their ninth in the league. The team improved on their previous season's output of 3–7–1, winning four games. They failed to qualify for the playoffs for the seventh consecutive season.

Schedule

Standings

References

Brooklyn Dodgers (NFL) seasons
Brooklyn Dodgers (NFL)
Brooklyn
1930s in Brooklyn
Flatbush, Brooklyn